Sir Charles Bullen Hugh Mitchell  (1836 – 7 December 1899) was a lieutenant-colonel in the Royal Marines, before joining the Colonial Service, in which he served in British Honduras, British Guiana, Natal. He then served as Governor of Fiji, of the British Colony of Natal & Zululand (1881–1882), and of the Straits Settlements (1 February 1894 to 7 December 1899).

Career

Military
Mitchell attended the Royal Naval School and joined the Royal Marines in 1852. He served with them in the Baltic campaigns from 1854 to 1856. He retired from the marines in 1878 as a lieutenant-colonel.

Civil career
Mitchell begin his colonial career as Colonial Secretary of British Honduras in July 1868. He also administrated the Government in 1870, 1874 and 1876.

Mitchell was the Receiver General in British Guiana in 1877 and followed by Colonial Secretary of Natal in November 1877. He was the Acting Governor of Natal in 1881, 1882 and 1885–1886.

Mitchell was the Governor of Fiji between 1887 and 1888.

Mitchell administered the Government of Natal and Zululand in 1889 and was eventually appointed as the Governor in the October of the same year.

Mitchell was the Governor of the Straits Settlement between 1894 and 1899.

Personal life
Mitchell's first wife Fanny Rice died in 1885. He remarried to Eliza Weldon. He had a son, Colonel Hugh Mitchell of the Royal Marines.

Mitchell died on 7 December 1899, while in office as Governor of the Straits Settlements. He was buried in St Andrew's Cathedral, Singapore, his tombstone was erected "To the glory of God and in memory of His Excellency Lieutenant Colonel Sir Charles Bullen Hugh Mitchell Royal Marine Light Infantry, G.C.M.G. Governor of the Colony who died in Singapore on 7 December 1899. This tablet is erected by the members of the Civil Service of the Straits Settlements."

Marines from  served as an honour guard and pallbearers for the Mitchell's funeral.

Awards and honours
Charles Mitchell was invested with Companion of the Most Distinguished Order of St. Michael and St. George (CMG) in 1880, Knight Commander of the Order of St Michael and St George (KCMG) in 1883 and Knight Grand Cross of the Order of St Michael and St George (GCMG) in 1895.

Legacy
Mitchell Park Zoo in Durban, South Africa is named after him.

References

External links
 
 

1836 births
1899 deaths
Governors of Fiji
Governors of Natal
Governors of the Straits Settlements
High Commissioners for the Western Pacific
Knights Grand Cross of the Order of St Michael and St George
People educated at the Royal Naval School
Royal Marines officers
Royal Navy personnel of the Crimean War
Administrators in British Singapore